is an American singer and voice actress based in Tokyo, Japan. She is a member of the voice acting idol group 22/7 which debuted in 2017 and is the group's "overseas representative". Within the group, she appears both as herself and as the animated character Sakura Fujima, for whom she provides the voice and motion capture.

In addition to 22/7, Amaki also provides the voices for other characters including Akubi from Pandora to Akubi, Carol Olston from Tomo-chan Is a Girl!, and Kiriko from Overwatch 2.

Career 
In 2016, Amaki moved from Los Angeles to Japan by herself to pursue voice acting, as she felt that anime brought a positive influence on her life and wanted to contribute back. She took and failed many auditions, in part due to her limited Japanese proficiency, until in December 2016, she successfully auditioned for Yasushi Akimoto's idol and anime girl group project, later named 22/7, despite her reluctance to become an idol in addition to becoming a voice actress.

Since the group's introduction, Amaki has attracted an international audience after a montage of her joking around in English went viral on Twitter. After noticing Amaki had drawn in a large overseas fan base, her character was rewritten as an English speaker. In May 2018, she and several other members of 22/7 have started their official Twitter accounts, where Amaki posts tweets in both English and Japanese. In June 2018, she became involved in 22/7's virtual YouTube marketing campaign as Sakura Fujima. In July 2018, Amaki and fellow members Mei Hanakawa and Reina Miyase appeared at Anime Expo 2018 in Los Angeles.

On June 19, 2019, Amaki revealed that she has suffered from social anxiety disorder since she joined the group and announced that she would be absent from handshake events while receiving treatment.

In March 2023, Amaki and presenter Jon Kabira hosted the 7th Crunchyroll Anime Awards in its first live ceremony in Tokyo.

Personal life 
Both of Amaki's parents are Japanese who emigrated to Los Angeles and met and got married there, which makes her a second generation Japanese American (nisei). She has an older brother.

Prior to moving to Japan, Amaki had trained in ballet and ice skating, the latter with the late Olympic figure skater Denis Ten. Her first language is English and in addition to Japanese, she also speaks some French and Spanish.

Amaki is a supporter of LGBT rights.

Discography

Filmography

Television

Original net animation

Film

Video games

Others

References

External links 
 Official blog 
 
 

2000 births
Living people
Actresses from Los Angeles
American actresses of Japanese descent
American emigrants to Japan
Japanese idols
Japanese video game actresses
Japanese voice actresses
Singers from Los Angeles
YouTubers from California
21st-century American actresses
21st-century American singers
21st-century Japanese singers
21st-century Japanese women singers